Kate Hergeaves (born 21 March 1970) is a former professional tennis player from Australia. She competed during her tennis career under her maiden name Kate McDonald.

Biography
A right-handed player from Albury, McDonald was the girls' doubles runner-up partnering Rennae Stubbs at the 1988 Australian Open. As a professional player she competed in the main draw of the Australian Open, French Open and Wimbledon during her career. She was most successful in the doubles format, with a top ranking of 103 in the world.

Now known as Kate Hergeaves, she has remained involved in tennis as a coach.

ITF finals

Singles (2–3)

Doubles (15–14)

References

External links
 
 

1970 births
Living people
Australian female tennis players
Sportspeople from Albury
Tennis people from New South Wales